Ben Zion Hyman (October 22, 1891 – July 17, 1984) was a Canadian Jewish bookseller. Originally from Mazyr in what is now Belarus, Hyman graduated from the Odessa Polytechnical Institute. After coming to Canada (settling first in Guelph, Ontario), he graduated in electrical engineering from the University of Toronto. Hyman and his wife, Fannie (née Konstantynowski), (in Polish, Fela; in Yiddish, Faigel), opened Jewish Toronto's most prominent book store, Hyman's Book and Art Shoppe (later known as Hyman's Booksellers, and still later known as Hyman & Son) at 412 Spadina Avenue in 1926. In 1953, his son Gurion Hyman opened a branch at 1032 Eglinton Avenue West in the Cedarvale/Forest Hill area of Toronto. Hyman closed the store in the early 1970s after the death of his wife.

During his life, Hyman was active as a member, founder and/or president of a number of organizations. These included: Hadassah, JIAS, Toronto Zionist Council, Toronto JNF, Keren Hatarbut, Poale Zion, and Farband. Hyman was an elected delegate to the first Canadian Jewish Congress in 1919. He also founded the Toronto Jewish Public Library in 1941.

References 
 Gasner, Cynthia. "Hyman's provided sforim for every occasion." The Canadian Jewish News, August 26, 1999, p. B5.
 Goldstein, Bonnie and Shulman, Jaclyn, eds. "Voices from the Heart: A Community Celebrates 50 Years of Israel." Toronto: McClelland & Stewart Inc., 1998. (See section "412 Spadina: From a Conversation with Gurion Hyman." p. 90-91).
 Abella, Irving. "A Coat of Many Colours: Two Centuries of Jewish Life in Canada." Toronto: Lester & Orpen Dennys Ltd., 1990, p. 125.
 Metro Page. "Little Jewish library moves its 30,000 books." The Toronto Star, October 28, 1983, p. A6.
 Speisman, Stephen. The Jews of Toronto. Toronto: McClelland and Stewart, 1979.
 Gottesman, Eli. Who's Who in Canadian Jewry, 1967. Page 275. Montreal: Central Rabbinical Seminary of Canada. Compiled by The Canadian Jewish Literary Foundation.
 Canadian Jewish Review, January 28, 1927
 Canadian Jewish Congress (Organizational Records 1919-). CJC0001,SA Administrative Records. CJC,SB Minutes.  (https://web.archive.org/web/20071219085531/http://www.cjccc.ca///national_archives/archives/arcguideCJC.htm)
 Ontario Jewish Archives entries for Hyman's Bookstore (both the 371 and 412 Spadina Avenue locations):  https://web.archive.org/web/20160917021038/http://search.ontariojewisharchives.org/List?q=%22Hyman%27s+Books+and+Art%22&p=1&ps=50
 Regarding Ben Zion Hyman's father, the Rev. M. Hyman see: Ontario Jewish Archives on Toronto Synagogues:  (http://www.ontariojewisharchives.org/exhibits/TorontoSynagogues/synogogues/Minsk/images/Early%20history/06.html)

1891 births
1984 deaths
People from Mazyr
People from Mozyrsky Uyezd
Belarusian Jews
Emigrants from the Russian Empire to Canada
Canadian people of Belarusian-Jewish descent
Canadian booksellers
University of Toronto alumni